Wa'ed Samir Tawfiq Al-Rawashdeh is a Jordanian footballer who plays as a defender. She has been a member of the Jordan women's national team.

References

Living people
Jordanian women's footballers
Women's association football defenders
Jordan women's international footballers
Year of birth missing (living people)